Neravanda Aiyappa, aka NC Aiyappa (born 19 October 1979), is a former Indian first-class cricketer who played in Ranji Trophy matches for Karnataka. He made his debut in first-class cricket on 2nd December 2001 in a match against Tamil Nadu.

Aiyappa is the younger brother of actress Prema. He contested in Bigg Boss Kannada season 3 in 2015-16.
He did his schooling

References

Living people
1979 births
Indian cricketers
Karnataka cricketers
Bigg Boss Kannada contestants